The 2018 Brăila attack occurred on November 11, 2018, where ten people were injured after a man stole a car before stabbing the owner and driving into people off the road and into a shopping mall in Brăila, Romania.

The attack
The attacker stole the car in the village of Cazasu, stabbed the owner, made some victims going onto the road then headed towards the Brăila Mall. The attacker entered the main door wounding more people, one witness recalled that the attacker constantly cried out "There must be blood flowing in the country!"

Perpetrator
The perpetrator was Valentin Marius Parfenie, a 20-year-old from Brăila. He had obtained his driving license in February 2018. He had problems with the law in the past; he and his father had assaulted a man. He was 17 when he committed these criminal acts, according to local police. Valentin's father was sentenced to two years imprisonment and Valentin received his oversight for six months. Valentin was incoherent, drunk and under the influence of drugs at the time of the attack.

References

November 2018 events in Romania
Braila attack
Brăila
November 2018 crimes in Europe
Road incidents in Romania
Attacks on shopping malls
Vehicular rampage in Europe
2018 disasters in Romania